Doische is a municipality of Wallonia located in the province of Namur, Belgium. 

On 1 January 2006 the municipality had 2,846 inhabitants. The total area is 84.02 km², giving a population density of 34 inhabitants per km².

The municipality consists of the following districts: Doische, Gimnée, Gochenée, Matagne-la-Grande, Matagne-la-Petite, Niverlée, Romerée, Soulme, Vaucelles, and Vodelée.

Notable residents
Philippe Buchez (1796-1865), historian, sociologist, and Utopian socialist politician
Daniel Petit (1948- ), Canadian politician for the New Democratic Party

See also
 List of protected heritage sites in Doische

References

External links
 
Official website 

Municipalities of Namur (province)